Georgia Sea Turtle Center is a nature center and rescue and rehabilitation facility for sea turtles on Jekyll Island, Georgia, United States, that was founded in 2007.

The Center features interactive exhibits and patient viewing areas. In addition to caring for sick and injured turtles, the Center has an educational mission, and presents daily programs, field trips, guided tours and beach walks.

The Center is housed in the former Power Plant building of the Jekyll Island Club, at 214 Stable Road. It is a contributing structure in the Jekyll Island Historic District, and listed on the National Register of Historic Places.

See also
Threats to sea turtles

References

External links
 Georgia Sea Turtle Center website
 Georgia Sea Turtle Center from ExploreGeorgia.org

Sea turtles
Nature centers in Georgia (U.S. state)
Nature conservation organizations based in the United States
Environmental organizations based in Georgia (U.S. state)
2007 establishments in Georgia (U.S. state)
Environmental organizations established in 2007
Jekyll Island
Turtle conservation organizations